The Port of Nashtoon is a Yemeni seaport located in Al-Mahra Governorate in the Arabian Sea.

History 
Established as a multi-purpose seaport to serve commercial and fishery traffic, the seaport was opened in April 1984. The port has one multipurpose berth of 210-meter and a 7-meter draft at the top of the berth. In 2010 the port was rehabilitated.

Location 
The Nashtoon Port is located on the Arabian Sea in Al-Mahra Governorate eastern Yemen. The port is close to Oman and is characterized by its commercial work between the Gulf countries and Al-Mahra and surrounding governorates eastern and northern Yemen.

See also 

 Port of Mukalla
 Yemen Arabian Sea Ports Corporation
 Hudaydah Port
 Port of Aden

References 

Government of Yemen
Transport in Yemen
Al Mahrah Governorate
Ports and harbours of Yemen